Florjan pri Gornjem Gradu is a settlement in the hills north and east of Gornji Grad in Slovenia. The area belongs to the traditional region of Styria and is now included in the Savinja statistical region.

Name
The name of the settlement was changed from Sveti Florjan (literally, 'Saint Florian') to Florjan pri Gornjem Gradu (literally, 'Florian near Gornji Grad') in 1953. The name was changed on the basis of the 1948 Law on Names of Settlements and Designations of Squares, Streets, and Buildings as part of efforts by Slovenia's postwar communist government to remove religious elements from toponyms.

Church
The local church is built on a hill in the south of the settlement overlooking Gornji Grad and is dedicated to Saints Primus and Felician and belongs to the Parish of Gornji Grad. It is a single-nave originally Romanesque building with an added sanctuary and a Baroque chapel and belfry.

References

External links
Florjan pri Gornjem Gradu on Geopedia

Populated places in the Municipality of Gornji Grad